The 1996–97 New York Knicks season was the 51st season for the Knicks in the National Basketball Association (NBA). For the season, the Knicks celebrated their 50th anniversary in the NBA by revealing an anniversary version of the team's primary logo. During the off-season, the team acquired All-Star forward Larry Johnson from the Charlotte Hornets, and signed free agents Allan Houston, Chris Childs, and former All-Star forward Buck Williams. In the regular season, the Knicks won eight of their first ten games, and held a 34–14 record by February 6, finishing in second place in the Atlantic Division with a 57–25 record, and made the NBA Playoffs for the 10th consecutive year. The team also posted three seven-game winning streaks during the regular season, which were its longest this season. The Knicks enjoyed a successful season, with their 57 wins tied for the third-most in franchise history; they finished second in the Atlantic Division and third in the Eastern Conference. 

With Houston in the regular starting lineup at shooting guard, John Starks played a sixth man role, averaging 13.8 points per game off the bench, and was named the Sixth Man of the Year, while Patrick Ewing averaged 22.4 points, 10.7 rebounds and 2.4 blocks per game, and was selected for the 1997 NBA All-Star Game, but did not play due to a groin injury, despite playing 78 games this season. It would also be his final All-Star selection, having played his final All-Star Game the previous year. Ewing also earned All-NBA Second Team honors, finished in eighth place in Most Valuable Player voting, and was named one of the 50 Greatest Players in NBA History. In addition, Houston finished second on the team in scoring with 14.8 points per game, while Johnson averaged 12.8 points and 5.2 rebounds per game, Charles Oakley provided the team with 10.8 points, 9.8 rebounds and 1.4 steals per game, and Childs contributed 9.3 points and 6.1 assists per game. Off the bench, Williams averaged 6.3 points and 5.4 rebounds per game, and Charlie Ward contributed 5.2 points and 4.1 assists per game. In the last game of the season, at the United Center, the Knicks defeated the then-69–12 Chicago Bulls, preventing them from posting two consecutive 70-win seasons, and tying the best home record (40–1 set by the 1985–86 Boston Celtics, and later matched by the 2015–16 San Antonio Spurs).

In the playoffs, New York defeated the Charlotte Hornets in a three-game sweep in the Eastern Conference first round, and advanced to the Eastern Conference semi-finals, where they faced the Atlantic Division champion Miami Heat, in what would eventually become the first chapter of one of the fiercest NBA rivalries of the period. After jumping to a 3–1 lead in the series, the Knicks were eliminated by the Heat in seven games, after a brawl erupted at the end of Game 5 that led to the suspensions of five key Knicks players: Ewing, Houston, Johnson, Starks and Ward. 

Following the season, top draft pick John Wallace was traded to the Toronto Raptors, and first round draft pick Walter McCarty was dealt to the Boston Celtics.

NBA Draft

Roster

Roster notes
Rookie small forward Dontae' Jones was on the injured reserve list with a foot injury, missed the entire season and never played for the Knicks.

Regular season

Season standings

z – clinched division title
y – clinched division title
x – clinched playoff spot

Record vs. opponents

Playoffs

|- align="center" bgcolor="#ccffcc"
| 1
| April 24
| Charlotte
| W 109–99
| Allan Houston (25)
| Patrick Ewing (9)
| Chris Childs (8)
| Madison Square Garden19,763
| 1–0
|- align="center" bgcolor="#ccffcc"
| 2
| April 26
| Charlotte
| W 100–93
| Patrick Ewing (30)
| Charles Oakley (10)
| Chris Childs (9)
| Madison Square Garden19,763
| 2–0
|- align="center" bgcolor="#ccffcc"
| 3
| April 28
| @ Charlotte
| W 104–95
| Larry Johnson (22)
| Patrick Ewing (11)
| Johnson, Childs (5)
| Charlotte Coliseum24,042
| 3–0
|-

|- align="center" bgcolor="#ccffcc"
| 1
| May 7
| @ Miami
| W 88–79
| Allan Houston (27)
| Patrick Ewing (16)
| Johnson, Ward (5)
| Miami Arena14,870
| 1–0
|- align="center" bgcolor="#ffcccc"
| 2
| May 9
| @ Miami
| L 84–88
| Allan Houston (19)
| Patrick Ewing (11)
| Chris Childs (7)
| Miami Arena14,870
| 1–1
|- align="center" bgcolor="#ccffcc"
| 3
| May 11
| Miami
| W 77–73
| Patrick Ewing (25)
| Ewing, Oakley (11)
| Ward, Starks (4)
| Madison Square Garden19,763
| 2–1
|- align="center" bgcolor="#ccffcc"
| 4
| May 12
| Miami
| W 89–76
| John Starks (21)
| Charles Oakley (9)
| Chris Childs (8)
| Madison Square Garden19,763
| 3–1
|- align="center" bgcolor="#ffcccc"
| 5
| May 14
| @ Miami
| L 81–96
| Patrick Ewing (19)
| Charles Oakley (9)
| Chris Childs (7)
| Miami Arena14,782
| 3–2
|- align="center" bgcolor="#ffcccc"
| 6
| May 16
| Miami
| L 90–95
| Chris Childs (22)
| Charles Oakley (12)
| Chris Childs (9)
| Madison Square Garden19,763
| 3–3
|- align="center" bgcolor="#ffcccc"
| 7
| May 18
| @ Miami
| L 90–101
| Patrick Ewing (37)
| Patrick Ewing (17)
| Charlie Ward (8)
| Miami Arena14,870
| 3–4
|-

Player statistics

NOTE: Please write player statistics in alphabetical order by last name.

Season

Playoffs

Awards and records
John Starks, NBA Sixth Man of the Year Award
Patrick Ewing, All-NBA Second Team

Transactions

References

New York Knicks seasons
1996 in sports in New York City
1997 in sports in New York City
New York Knick
1990s in Manhattan
Madison Square Garden